In graph theory, a branch of mathematics, the th power  of an undirected graph  is another graph that has the same set of vertices, but in which two vertices are adjacent when their distance in  is at most .

Graph powers should be distinguished from the products of a graph with itself, which (unlike powers) generally have many more vertices than the original graph.

Properties
If a graph has diameter , then its -th power is the complete graph. If a graph family has bounded clique-width, then so do its -th powers for any fixed .

Coloring
Graph coloring on the square of a graph may be used to assign frequencies to the participants of wireless communication networks so that no two participants interfere with each other at any of their common neighbors, and to find graph drawings with high angular resolution.

For the special case of a square of a planar graph, Wegner conjectured in 1977 that the chromatic number of the square of a planar graph is at most , and it is known that the chromatic number is at most .

Determining the minimum number of colors needed to color the square of a graph is NP-hard, even in the planar case.

Hamiltonicity
The cube of every connected graph necessarily contains a Hamiltonian cycle. It is not necessarily the case that the square of a connected graph is Hamiltonian, and it is NP-complete to determine whether the square is Hamiltonian. Nevertheless, by Fleischner's theorem, the square of a 2-vertex-connected graph is always Hamiltonian.

Computational complexity
The th power of a graph with  vertices and  edges may be computed in time  by performing a breadth first search starting from each vertex to determine the distances to all other vertices, or slightly faster using more sophisticated algorithms. Alternatively, If  is an adjacency matrix for the graph, modified to have nonzero entries on its main diagonal, then the nonzero entries of  give the adjacency matrix of the th power of the graph, from which it follows that constructing th powers may be performed in an amount of time that is within a logarithmic factor of the time for matrix multiplication.

The th powers of trees can be recognized in time linear in the size of the input graph.

Given a graph, deciding whether it is the square of another graph is NP-complete.

Induced subgraphs

Map graphs are the half-squares of planar graphs, and halved cube graphs are the half-squares of hypercube graphs.

Leaf powers are the subgraphs of powers of trees induced by the leaves of the tree.

References

Graph operations